Scott Virkus (born September 7, 1959) is a former American football defensive end. He played for the Buffalo Bills from 1983 to 1984, the Indianapolis Colts and New England Patriots in 1984 and for the Indianapolis Colts in 1985.

References

1959 births
Living people
American football defensive ends
Purdue Boilermakers football players
Buffalo Bills players
Indianapolis Colts players
New England Patriots players
Saskatchewan Roughriders players